Robert or Rob Nelson is the name of:

Entertainment
 Robert Lyn Nelson (born 1955), American artist
 Rob Nelson (talk show host) (born 1964), American talk show host and filmmaker
 Robert Nelson (filmmaker) (1930–2012), American experimental filmmaker
 Rob Nelson (biologist) (born 1979), American biologist, documentary filmmaker and television personality

Religion
 Robert Nelson (bishop) (1913–1959), British bishop of Middleton, 1958–1958
 Robert Nelson (nonjuror) (1656–1715), English religious writer
 J. Robert Nelson (1920–2004), American Methodist theologian

Sports
 Rob Nelson (baseball) (born 1964), American baseball first baseman
 Robert Nelson (American football) (born 1990), American football player
 Robert Nelson (cricketer, born 1912) (1912–1940), English cricketer
 Robert Nelson (cricketer, born 1970) (born 1970), English cricketer
 Tex Nelson (Robert Sidney Nelson, 1936–2011), American baseball player

Other
 Robert Nelson (insurrectionist) (1794–1873), physician and leading figure in the Lower Canada Rebellion
 Robert Henry Nelson (1853–1892), British Army officer and African explorer
 Robert Nelson (British politician) (1888–1932), British Member of Parliament for Motherwell, 1918–1922
 Robert T. Nelson (born 1936), vice admiral in the United States Coast Guard
 Robert Nelson (economist) (born 1944), professor of environmental policy
 Rob Nelson (reporter) (born 1978), American news reporter
 Robert Nelson (entomologist) (1903–1996), American entomologist and  agricultural researcher

See also
 Robert Neilson (1878–1946), Scotland international rugby union player
 Bob Neilson (1923–2014), New Zealand rugby league player
 Robert Nielsen (1922–2009), Canadian journalist
 Bob Nelson (disambiguation)
 Bobby Nelson (disambiguation)
 Bert Nelson (disambiguation)
 Nelson (surname)